Talatau Junior Amone (born 10 April 2002) is a Tonga international rugby league footballer who plays as a  or  for the St. George Illawarra Dragons in the NRL.

Background
Amone played his junior rugby league for the Western Suburbs Red Devils. He is of Tongan descent.

Playing career

2021
Amone made his debut in round 9 of the 2021 NRL season for St. George Illawarra against Canterbury-Bankstown, scoring a try on debut in a 32-12 victory.
Amone made eleven appearances for the club throughout the season as the club finished 11th and missed out on the finals.

2022
In round 22 of the 2022 NRL season, Amone scored a hat-trick in St. George's 24-22 loss against the Canberra Raiders.
On Thursday 11 August 2022, Amone signed a Contract Extension with the Saints until the end of the 2024 NRL season.
In round 23, Amone scored two tries in a 46-26 victory over the Gold Coast Titans.

Statistics

Criminal charges 
In December 2022, Amone was charged with reckless grievous bodily harm in company, destroying property and intimidation following an alleged attack on a roofing contractor at Warrawong on 15 November 2022.

References

External links

St George Illawarra Dragons profile

2002 births
Australian rugby league players
Australian sportspeople of Tongan descent
Rugby league five-eighths
Rugby league players from Wollongong
St. George Illawarra Dragons players
Tonga national rugby league team players
Living people